Konstantinos Kallaris (1858–1940) was a senior Hellenic Army officer who distinguished himself in the Balkan Wars of 1912–1913.

Born in Athens in 1858, Kallaris studied at the Hellenic Military Academy and was commissioned into the Army on 28 July 1880 as an Ensign of Engineers. He fought in the Greco-Turkish War of 1897. Due to his extensive education, he was placed in the General Staff Corps upon its creation in 1905. In early 1911 he was placed as commander of the 2nd Infantry Division at Athens, which quickly became a model formation under the supervision of the French military mission to Greece.

Promoted to Major General, he led his division in the First Balkan War, where he lost one of his sons, Spyridon, during the Battle of Bizani (his second son Angelos fell in the Asia Minor Campaign in 1922). Kallaris led the 2nd Division in the Second Balkan War as well, first in the attack against the Bulgarian garrison in Thessaloniki and thereafter in the battles of Kilkis and Kresna.

In 1914, promoted to Lieutenant General, he assumed command of the newly established I Army Corps. He served briefly as Minister of Military Affairs in the summer of 1916, and retired from service on 29 June 1918.

He died in 1940.

References

Sources
 

1858 births
1940 deaths
Hellenic Army lieutenant generals
Greek military personnel of the Balkan Wars
Military personnel from Athens
Ministers of Military Affairs of Greece